Ceriporia spissa is a species of fungus in the family Irpicaceae. It is a plant pathogen.

References

Fungi described in 1822
Fungal plant pathogens and diseases
Irpicaceae
Fungi of North America